Manzat (Auvergnat: Manzac) is a commune in the Puy-de-Dôme department in Auvergne in central France.

See also
Communes of the Puy-de-Dôme department

References

External links

 Commune de Manzat, official website
 Personal website about Manzat 

Communes of Puy-de-Dôme